Daddy Long Legs (1955) is a Hollywood musical comedy film set in France, New York City, and the fictional college town of Walston, Massachusetts. The film was directed by Jean Negulesco, and stars Fred Astaire, Leslie Caron, Terry Moore, Fred Clark, and Thelma Ritter, with music and lyrics by Johnny Mercer. The screenplay was written by Phoebe Ephron and Henry Ephron, loosely based on the 1912 novel Daddy-Long-Legs by Jean Webster.

This was the first of three consecutive Astaire films set in France or with a French theme (the others being Funny Face and Silk Stockings), following the fashion for French-themed musicals established by ardent Francophile Gene Kelly with An American in Paris (1951), which also featured Kelly's protégée Caron. Like The Band Wagon, Daddy Long Legs did only moderately well at the box office.

Plot summary
Wealthy American Jervis Pendleton III has a chance encounter at a French orphanage with cheerful 18-year-old resident Julie André. He anonymously pays for her education at a New England college. She writes letters to her mysterious benefactor, whom she calls Daddy Long Legs (based on her fellow orphans' description of his shadow), but he never writes back. Several years later, he visits her at school, still concealing his identity. Despite their wide age difference, they fall in love.

Cast
 Fred Astaire as Jervis Pendleton III
 Leslie Caron as Julie André
 Terry Moore as Linda Pendleton
 Thelma Ritter as Alicia Pritchard
 Fred Clark as Griggs
 Charlotte Austin as Sally McBride
 Larry Keating as Ambassador Alexander Williamson
 Kathryn Givney as Gertrude Pendleton
 Kelly Brown as Jimmy McBride
 Ray Anthony as himself (as Ray Anthony and His Orchestra)
 Olan Soule as Assistant Manager (uncredited)
 Percival Vivian as Professor (uncredited)

Production
20th Century Fox bought the rights to Jean Webster's original Daddy Long Legs in 1931, releasing two versions of the film, one starring Janet Gaynor and one with Shirley Temple.

Producer Darryl F. Zanuck envisioned a remake, this time seeking to star singer-actress Mitzi Gaynor. The project would not be realized until Zanuck met Fred Astaire and was inspired to make Daddy Long Legs a musical film. While Zanuck still envisioned Gaynor for the main female role, Astaire insisted on casting actress and dancer Leslie Caron. Caron was then loaned to Fox by MGM, with whom Caron was still under contract.

Production was halted in July 1954, as Astaire's wife Phyllis became ill from lung cancer. She died in September, putting Astaire in a state of grief and stalling his work on the film. Although replacements were sought for Astaire's role, as too much money had already been spent on the production, he resumed and completed the film.

Key songs/dance routines
Astaire had previously attempted to integrate ballet into his dance routines in Shall We Dance (1937). As his first film in Cinemascope widescreen–which he was to parody later in the "Stereophonic Sound" number from Silk Stockings (1957)–Daddy Long Legs provided Astaire the opportunity to explore the additional space available, with the help of his assistant choreographer Dave Robel. Roland Petit designed the much-maligned "Nightmare Ballet" number. As usual, Astaire adapted his choreography to the particular strengths of his partner, in this case ballet. Even so, Caron ran into some problems making the film, her last dance musical, which she attributed to her early musical training. Astaire mentioned in his biography that "one day at rehearsals I asked her to listen extra carefully to the music, so as to keep in time."

 "History of the Beat": This is an Astaire song-and-dance solo using drumsticks performed in an office environment, recalling the "Nice Work If You Can Get It" routine from A Damsel in Distress (1937) and the "Drum Crazy" number from Easter Parade (1948).  As this was the first number to be filmed, some commentators have speculated that it was affected by Astaire's grief at his wife's death.
 "Daddy Long Legs": An off-screen female chorus sings this attractive number while Caron muses fondly at a blackboard cartoon sketch of Astaire.
 "Daydream Sequence": Astaire appears in three guises: a Texan, an international playboy and a guardian angel based on images of him described in letters from Caron. As a Texan, he performs a comic square-dance routine to a short song dubbed by Thurl Ravenscroft, the only time in his career that Astaire's voice was dubbed. As an international playboy, he tangoes his way through a flock of women, including Barrie Chase, later to be his dance partner in all of his television specials from 1958 to 1968. The third routine is a gentle romantic dance with Caron, who performs graceful ballet steps while Astaire glides admiringly around her.
 "Sluefoot": This is a boisterous and joyous dance with Astaire and Caron involving sharp leg movements. Astaire inserts a short and zany solo segment, and the chorus join in toward the end. The band leader in this scene is Ray Anthony.
 "Something's Gotta Give": Astaire was grateful to his friend Mercer for composing this now-famous standard, as he felt that the film lacked a strong popular song. Some commentators have detected a certain stiffness in Caron, especially in her upper body.
 "Nightmare Ballet": This is a solo routine for Caron frequently criticized for its content and length (12 minutes).
 "Dream": This is a short romantic routine for Astaire and Caron with dreamlike twirling motifs and, unusually for Astaire, a kiss.

Awards and nominations

The film was nominated by the American Film Institute for inclusion in these lists:
 2002: AFI's 100 Years...100 Passions
 2006: AFI's Greatest Movie Musicals

Reception 
The Japanese filmmaker Akira Kurosawa cited Daddy Long Legs as one of his 100 favorite films.

References

 Fred Astaire: Steps in Time, 1959, multiple reprints.
 John Mueller: Astaire Dancing – The Musical Films of Fred Astaire, Knopf 1985,

External links
 
 
 
 
 

1955 films
1955 musical comedy films
1955 romantic comedy films
American musical comedy films
American romantic comedy films
American romantic musical films
Films about orphans
Films based on American novels
Films based on romance novels
Films directed by Jean Negulesco
Films scored by Cyril J. Mockridge
Films scored by Alfred Newman
Films set in Massachusetts
Films set in New York City
Films set in France
20th Century Fox films
Films based on adaptations
CinemaScope films
1950s English-language films
1950s American films